Sweeney is a surname that is of Irish origin, derived from the Gaelic Mac Suibhne meaning "son of Suibhne". The Gaelic personal name Suibhne was originally a byname meaning "pleasant" or "well-disposed" and is associated with Clan Sweeney.

In the United States, the surname Sweeney can also be an Americanization of the French surname Choinière. This French surname is derived from choin, meaning white, and probably originated as an occupational name for a baker.

People with the surname
 A. William Sweeney (1920–2003), Ohio Supreme Court justice
 Alison Sweeney (born 1976), American television actress
 Anne Sweeney (born 1957), Co-Chair of Disney Media Networks and President of Disney–ABC Television Group
 Antony Sweeney (born 1983), English footballer
 Antony G. Sweeney (born 1955), English director of the Australian Centre for the Moving Image
 Bill Sweeney (CEO), CEO of the International Foundation for Electoral Systems
 Bill Sweeney (first baseman) (1904–1957), baseball player
 Bill Sweeney (footballer) (1914–1973), Australian footballer
 Bill Sweeney (ice hockey) (1937–1991), Canadian ice hockey player
 Bill Sweeney (infielder) (1886–1948), American baseball player
 Bill Sweeney (pitcher) (1858–1903), baseball player
 Bo Sweeney (1862–1917), American politician
 Bob Sweeney (ice hockey) (born 1964), American retired National Hockey League player
 Bob Sweeney (TV director and producer) (1918–1992), American actor, director and producer
 Bob K.O. Sweeney (1894–1961), American boxer
 Brian Sweeney (born 1974), American former baseball player
 Brody Sweeney, Irish entrepreneur
 Bruce Sweeney, Canadian film director
 Calvin Sweeney (born 1955), American former National Football League player
 Ceri Sweeney (born 1980), Welsh rugby union footballer
 Charles Sweeney (disambiguation)
 Charlie Sweeney (1863–1902), American Major League Baseball pitcher
 Ciaran Sweeney (born 1971), Irish designer
 Claire Sweeney (born 1971), English actress and singer
 Craig Sweeney (born 1982), Welsh child sex offender
 D. B. Sweeney (born 1961), American actor
 Daisy Sweeney (1920–2017), Canadian music teacher
 Daren Sweeney (born 1970), Montserratian cricketer
 Dennis Sweeney, murderer of American politician Allard K. Lowenstein in 1980
 Don Sweeney (born 1966), Canadian former National Hockey League player
 Dora M. Sweeney (1907–2001), American politician
 Ed Sweeney (baseball) (1888–1947), professional baseball player
 Ed Sweeney (American football) (1949–2017), American football coach and former player
 Ed Sweeney, inventor of the Aerocar 2000 and Gemini Hummingbird
 Eric Sweeney (1903–1968), English footballer
 Fionnuala Sweeney (born 1965), Irish anchorwoman and reporter for CNN International
 Frances Sweeney (1908–1944), American journalist and activist
 Francis E. Sweeney (1934–2011), American politician and Ohio Supreme Court justice
 Francis J. Sweeney (1862–?), Canadian lawyer and politician
 George Sweeney (actor), British actor
 Hank Sweeney (1915–1980), American professional baseball player
 Jack Sweeney, American programmer and entrepreneur 
 James Sweeney (disambiguation), several people
 Jason Sweeney (1986–2003), American murder victim
 Jim Sweeney (disambiguation)
 Joel Sweeney (1810–1860), American musician and early blackface minstrel performer
 John Sweeney (disambiguation)
 Joseph Sweeney (Irish politician), (1897–1980), Irish politician
 Joseph Sweeney (actor), (1884–1963), American actor
 Julia Sweeney (born 1959), American actress and comedian
 Justin Sweeney, (born 1987), Australian rules footballer
 Kevin Sweeney (American football) (born 1963), American former football quarterback
 Kevin Sweeney, British businessman convicted of murder in 2001 – see Kevin Sweeney case
 Kyle Sweeney (born 1981), American lacrosse player
 Larry Sweeney (1981–2011), American professional wrestler
 Latanya Sweeney, American computer scientist and Harvard University professor
 Madeline Amy Sweeney (1965–2001), a flight attendant on board American Airlines Flight 11 on 9/11
 Margaret Sweeney (swimmer) (born 1929/1930), former New Zealand long-distance swimmer
 Mark Sweeney (born 1969), American former Major League Baseball player
 Mark Sweeney (politician) (1959–2022), American politician
 Martin L. Sweeney (1885–1960), American politician
 Mary Sweeney, American film editor and film producer
 Mary Ann Sweeney (born 1945), American physicist
 Matt Sweeney, American guitarist, singer and producer
 Matthew Sweeney (1951–2018), Irish poet
 Mavis Sweeney (1909–1986), Australian hospital pharmacist 
 Michelle Sweeney, American-born Canadian actress and musician
 Michael or Mike Sweeney (disambiguation)
 Monroe Sweeney (1892–1950), American baseball umpire
 Neil Sweeney (born 1977), Australian rugby player
 Nigel Sweeney (born 1954), UK barrister and High Court judge
 Patrick Sweeney (disambiguation)
 Paul Sweeney (born 1989), MP and shadow Under-Secretary of State for Scotland
 Peter Sweeney (born 1984), Scottish footballer
 Peter Sweeney (footballer), Scottish-American footballer
 Randy Sweeney (born 1956), American research scientist
 Robert Augustus Sweeney (1853–1890), only African-American two-time recipient of the Medal of Honor
 Robert E. Sweeney (1924–2007), American politician
 Robert K. Sweeney (born 1949), American politician
 Ryan Sweeney (baseball), (born 1985), American professional baseball player
 Sam Sweeney (born 1989), English folk musician
 Sam Sweeney (cricketer) (born 1990), English cricketer
 Sean Sweeney (born 1969), Scottish professional football player
 Stephen M. Sweeney (born 1959), American politician
 Steve Sweeney (born 1949), American comedian
 Sunny Sweeney (born 1976), American country music singer
 Sylvia Sweeney (born 1956), Canadian journalist, television producer and Olympic athlete
 Sydney Sweeney (born 1997), American actress
 Tara Sweeney (born 1973), American politician
 Terry Sweeney (born 1969), American writer, comedian and actor
 Thomas Sweeney (disambiguation)
 Tommy Sweeney (born 1997), American football player
 Tim Sweeney (disambiguation)
 Walt Sweeney (1941–2013), American, professional American football player
 Walter Sweeney (disambiguation)
 William Sweeney (disambiguation)
 Zhaun Sweeney (born 1979), Montserratian cricketer

People with the given name
 Sweeney Schriner (1911–1990), Russian-born Canadian, professional ice hockey player
 Sweeney Young (born 1988), Australian actor

Fictional characters
 Sweeney Todd, fictional barber and serial killer
 Sweeney, the anti-hero of several works by T. S. Eliot, including The Waste Land and the verse drama Sweeney Agonistes
 Moira/Max Sweeney, on the Showtime television network series The L Word
 Sinbad Sweeney, in the Channel 4 soap opera Brookside
 Mr. Sweeney, in Ned's Declassified School Survival Guide
 The Sweeney Sisters, a recurring musical SNL sketch from the 1980s featuring Candy Sweeney (Jan Hooks) and her sister Liz (Nora Dunn)
 Lieutenant Sweeney, in the 2005 film Dead Men Walking
 Sweeney, the main character in the Irish legend seen in Sweeney Astray
 Ram Sweeney, fictional character in the 1988 black comedy film Heathers, and it's musical and TV adaptations
 Mad Sweeney, fictional character in the series American Gods
 Conor MacSweeney (Alex Murphy), protagonist of the Irish film and television series The Young Offenders
Reno Sweeney, the evangelist turned nightclub singer from Anything Goes

See also
 List of Irish-language given names
 List of Scottish Gaelic given names

References

Americanized surnames
English-language surnames
Anglicised Irish-language surnames